Rowshanara Moni (born 1974) is a Bangladeshi-born British singer and actress.

Early life
Moni was born South Sylhet Mahakuma, Bangladesh. She is the sixth child of Mohammed Samroo, who was businessman in the United Kingdom, and Syeda Sufia Khanum, who was a politician in Bangladesh.

Moni completed her primary education in Bangladesh and moved to the UK in 1984 when she was 10 years old. She completed her education in the UK and attended Holland Park School. In 1989, she left school after completing her GCSEs.

Career
Moni has been singing since the age of six. After coming to UK, she joined Dishari Shilpi Gosthi and performed in many stage programmes. At the age of 11, she performed in the Royal Albert Hall for Save the Children.

Apart from singing she took an interest in acting. The first stage drama she took part is in Khotto Bikkhoto in Camden and she also took part in many other stage dramas. She acted in the first Bangla TV (UK) drama called Laal Golap written by Abdul Gaffar Choudhury. She took part in radio dramas in the Sunrise Radio Bengali department with Azizul Hakim, she was also a presenter for Sunrise Radio in the Bengali department.

In 2004, Moni released her debut album Nijhum Raat. In May 2011, she performed at the Boishakhi Mela.

Since December 2001, she has worked full-time as an abdominal aortic aneurysm administrator in cardiology at Imperial College Healthcare NHS Trust in London. currently working as a senior administrator for Chest Pain Clinic in Imperial Health care.

Awards and recognition
In 1985, Moni competed in the Bengali Song Contest, which was organised by Tower Hamlets Borough, and won first prize in folk song. In 1986, she won second prize in folk song and modern song, and 1987 and 1988, she has won second prize in modern song and folk song.

Personal life
At the age of 18, Moni got married in Bangladesh to Mohammed Iqbal (Faisal), who was a civil engineer in the Water Development Board in Bangladesh. They have a son Aynan Shabab Iqbal.

Discography

Albums
Nijhum Raat (2004)

See also
 British Bangladeshi
 List of British Bangladeshis
 Music of Bengal

References

External links
 
 

1974 births
Living people
Date of birth missing (living people)
British Muslims
Bangladeshi emigrants to England
21st-century Bangladeshi women singers
21st-century Bangladeshi singers
Bengali-language singers
Bangladeshi stage actresses
British stage actresses
British actresses of South Asian descent
British hospital administrators
Singers from London
Actresses from London
People from Moulvibazar District
People educated at Holland Park School
21st-century British women singers